Chionodes meridiochilensis is a moth in the family Gelechiidae. It is found in southern Chile.

The length of the forewings is about 9.9 mm. The forewings are slate-grey with a blackish-grey costal margin, interspersed with paler scales. The hindwings are greyish-silvery white.

The larvae feed on Muehlenbeckia hastulata. They roll the leaves of their host plant and feed from within the feeding tube.

References

Chionodes
Moths described in 2012
Moths of South America
Endemic fauna of Chile